The William Hood House  was built in 1858 by William Hood. Its California Historical Landmark number is 692. It was listed on the National Register of Historic Places on February 6, 1998.

The house was built from bricks that were made on the property. An adobe building, a vineyard and a winery were built with the house, none of which remain.

The Knights of Pythias bought the house in 1924, after several different owners including United States Senator mining magnate, railroad and newspaper owner Thomas Kearns. The Los Guilicos School for Girls purchased the land in 1943.

A sign posted in November 2008 states that, after restoration, the house would be opened to the public.

See also 
 Hood Mountain
 National Register of Historic Places listings in Sonoma County, California

References 

Houses completed in 1858
Houses in Sonoma County, California
Houses on the National Register of Historic Places in California
National Register of Historic Places in Sonoma County, California
Colonial Revival architecture in California
Victorian architecture in California
Knights of Pythias buildings
Houses in Santa Rosa, California